High Tor is a soundtrack album featuring Bing Crosby, Julie Andrews and Everett Sloane. It was primarily taken from the soundtrack of the Ford Star Jubilee TV film aired on March 10, 1956 by CBS. A musical adaptation of Maxwell Anderson’s play of the same name, the soundtrack album was released in 1956 by Decca Records, (catalogue number, DL 8272) and the album was later issued on CD by Stage Door Records in 2017 (catalogue No. STAGE 2420).

Julie Andrews' songs from the film were included on the Sepia Records CD "Once Upon a Time"  (Sepia 1103) released in 2007.

Content and reception
Bing Crosby linked dialogue and songs from the soundtrack and recorded "When You’re in Love" and "John Barleycorn" separately for inclusion in the album. "When You’re in Love" had been essayed by Julie Andrews and Everett Sloane in the film and it was fitting that Crosby should add his own version. "John Barleycorn" had been sung by Crosby in the film but it was decided to make a longer rendering as a finale. The songs used in the soundtrack were recorded on October 31 and early in November 1955. Joseph J. Lilley & his Orchestra provided the musical backing for the album. All the songs were written by Arthur Schwartz (music) and Maxwell Anderson (lyrics). 
The film itself was not very well received, see also High Tor (play), but the album had a better reception with Billboard magazine saying, “High Tor” is an excellent package of Crosbiana, and if the show is as big a click as expected, the LP should enjoy brisk sales.”

Track listing

References 

1956 soundtrack albums
Bing Crosby soundtracks
Decca Records soundtracks